William Army is an American retired ice hockey center who was an All-American for Boston College.

Career
Army began attending Boston College in the fall of 1976 after having been recruited for the ice hockey team by Len Ceglarski. After a pedestrian freshman season, Army more than doubled his point production as a sophomore and finished second on the team with 60 points. He helped lead the team to a surprising conference championship and their first NCAA title game in thirteen years. While the Eagles were unsuccessful in their championship bid, Army had firmly established himself as a star for BC. In 1979 he was invited to try out for the national team in the run up to the 1980 Winter Olympics, along with teammate Joe Mullen (neither were ultimately selected). His scoring declined sharply after 1978 but he remained a major part of the Boston College offense and led the team in scoring as a senior. He was named as an All-American despite finishing more than 50 points behind the nation's leader.

After graduating, Army embarked on a short professional career before retiring after the 1982 season. He was inducted into the Boston College Athletic Hall of Fame in 1986.

Personal life
Bill's younger brother Tim played college hockey at Providence and went on to a long coaching career including stops in the college- and NHL-levels.

Statistics

Regular season and playoffs

Awards and honors

References

External links

1957 births
Living people
Ice hockey players from Rhode Island
People from East Providence, Rhode Island
American ice hockey centers
AHCA Division I men's ice hockey All-Americans
Boston College Eagles men's ice hockey players
Rochester Americans players
Port Huron Flags players
Flint Generals players